Valenzuela is a surname that originated in Spain.

Notable people with the name include:

 Alfred Valenzuela, Mexican-American United States Army general
 Arturo Valenzuela, Chilean-American academic
 Cristina Valenzuela, American voice actress
 Eric Valenzuela, American college baseball coach
 Fernando de Valenzuela, 1st Marquis of Villasierra, Spanish royal favourite and minister
 Fernando Valenzuela, Mexican former professional baseball pitcher
 Ismael Valenzuela, American horse racing jockey
 Jesse Valenzuela, American musician
Juan Carlos Valenzuela (footballer), Mexican footballer 
Juan Carlos Valenzuela (politician), Honduran politician
 Luisa Valenzuela, Post-modern Argentine novelist
 Pat Valenzuela, American horse racing jockey, nephew of Ismael Valenzuela
 Pío Valenzuela, Filipino physician and patriot
 Ricardo Valenzuela, American former soccer referee
 Richard Valenzuela, birth name of Mexican-American musician Ritchie Valens

Surnames of Spanish origin
Spanish-language surnames